Ira Spring (1918–2003) was an American photographer, author, mountaineer and hiking advocate. He was the photographer and co-author, with Harvey Manning and his brother Bob Spring, of the "100 Hikes" series of books published by The Mountaineers. He co-founded the trails advocacy and maintenance organization Washington Trails Association (WTA) along with fellow trails advocate Louise Marshall. In 1998 he published an autobiography entitled "An Ice Axe, a Camera, and a jar of Peanut Butter" detailing his long photographic career on several continents. In recognition of this work in conservation and wilderness-preservation, he was presented with the Roosevelt Conservation Award by President George H. W. Bush in 1992. Spring was born in Jamestown, New York with a twin, Bob, and grew up in Shelton, Washington. He was an army aerial photographer in World War II. He died on June 5, 2003, in Edmonds, Washington of prostate cancer.

References

Further reading

1918 births
2003 deaths
American environmentalists
American non-fiction outdoors writers
American male non-fiction writers
20th-century American photographers
Hikers
Writers from Washington (state)
People from Edmonds, Washington
Deaths from prostate cancer
20th-century American male writers
United States Army personnel of World War II